Nobuatsu (written: 宣篤, 信敦 or 伸篤) is a masculine Japanese given name. Notable people with the name include:

, Japanese motorcycle racer
, Japanese daimyō
, Japanese sprint canoeist

Japanese masculine given names